Anik Jean (born April 11, 1977) is a Canadian pop and rock singer, actress, director, and screenwriter. She is most noted for her 2005 album Le Trashy Saloon, which was a shortlisted Juno Award finalist for Francophone Album of the Year at the Juno Awards of 2006.

Career
From a young age, Anik Jean has been drawn to performing.  Attending a David Bowie concert with her mother when she was 11 years old, Anik decided she wanted to be a singer-songwriter. She learned how to play guitar and piano and embarked on a trip that would take her from her native Gaspésie to Los Angeles before eventually returning to Montreal.

In the spring of 2005, her first single, "Je suis partie", topped the Top 5 on the radio charts in Quebec, which laid the groundwork for the release of her debut album Le Trashy Saloon in August of that same year. The song was written by Anik’s mentor, Quebec rock legend, Jean Leloup, who also co-produced the album with David Strutton. Anik cowrote the follow-up single, "Junkie de toi", with Jean Leloup, and rose ever higher than before on the  top 40 charts. She opened for The Rolling Stones at their concert in Montreal in January 2006.

For her second album in 2008, Anik worked with Mark Plati, the producer for David Bowie, Alain Bashung, Louise Attaque and Les Rita Mitsouko. She was backed by musicians: Earl Slick, Mike Garson, Sam Harrison, Jean-Sébastien Chouinard, Alec McElcheran, Julien Blais and Antoine Gratton. She released her second album, Le ciel saigne le martyre, a rock record that demonstrates the artists growing maturity. The first single, Oh mon chéri, rose in the charts quickly and caused a sensation among her growing fans.

In 2010, Anik Jean produced her third album herself, the self-titled, Anik Jean.  Recording in New York and Montréal, the singer-songwriter co-wrote some of the songs with her friend, Earl Slick, and finished the album with musical help from Gail Ann Dorsey and Sterling Campbell, two members of David Bowie’s group. The single, J’aurai tout essayé, a duet with Robert Smith of The Cure, stayed at the top of the charts for nearly a year. The album was later nominated for “Best Pop Album” at the ADISQ awards.

In 2013, Anik composed the music for her celebrated husband, Patrick Huard’s, new stand-up show; she made her on-screen debut in the film Filière 13 (File 13); and she worked with designer Marie Saint-Pierre. Her fourth album, Schizophrène, was inspired by her brother, who was suffering from schizophrenia. Recorded entirely in her home studio, the abstract and highly personal album was dedicated to her brother, who passed away that same year.

In 2015, Anik went back to basics for her first English-language album, Lost Soul which deviated from her typical rock style but being primarily composed of ballads. Her sound, however, remained reliably intense and the music became the soundtrack to a feature film of the same name which went on to be showcased at the two most prestigious film festivals in Quebec.

In 2016, Anik was asked to score her first film, the Canadian box office hit, Bon Cop Bad Cop 2. Her soundtrack won the SOCAN PRIZE for best film score in 2019.

Working on her music videos with directors Robin Aubert and Francis Leclerc, Anik was exposed to filmmaking, and she was immediately hooked. It all came together for her when she co-directed her feature, Lost Soul in 2015-2016.

Her second short film, La Porte, screened opening night at Québec Cinéma 2019 and was selected for the St. John’s International Women’s Film Festival, and her most recent work, Sois Sage, was presented at the Fantasia International Film Festival, with several of her film scripts in development.

In 2021, in parallel with the release of her second children’s book Nathan at the Bottom of the Ocean, she is working on the original music for Escouade 99 (an adaptation of the Brooklyn Nine Nine series). In October, she released her new and highly anticipated sixth album Love in Silence.

Currently, Anik is dedicated to writing the feature film Lazy Bogan House.

Discography

Filmography

Books 

 Nathan at the bottom of the ocean (2021)
 Nathan in the land of pirates (2020)
 Magnum 66 (2009)

References

External links

1977 births
Canadian women singer-songwriters
Canadian singer-songwriters
Canadian film score composers
Canadian women screenwriters
Canadian rock singers
Canadian pop singers
Canadian film actresses
Actresses from Quebec
Musicians from Quebec
Writers from Quebec
Living people
French-language singers of Canada
People from Gaspésie–Îles-de-la-Madeleine
21st-century Canadian actresses
21st-century Canadian screenwriters
21st-century Canadian women singers
Canadian women composers